The 1959–60 UCLA Bruins men's basketball team represented the University of California, Los Angeles during the 1959–60 NCAA University Division men's basketball season and were members of the Athletic Association of Western Universities. The Bruins were led by 12th year head coach John Wooden. They finished the regular season with a record of 14–12 and finished second in the AAWU with a record of 7–5. After five years at the Pan-Pacific Auditorium, UCLA moved to the new Los Angeles Memorial Sports Arena.

Previous season

The Bruins finished the regular season with a record of 16–9 and finished third in the PCC with a record of 10–6.

Roster

Schedule

|-
!colspan=9 style=|Regular Season

Source

References

UCLA Bruins men's basketball seasons
UCLA
UCLA Bruins Basketball
UCLA Bruins Basketball